Sunrise is a journal of the Theosophical Society Pasadena.

History
The journal was founded by James A. Long in October 1951. After the death of Long, the journal has been published by Grace F. Knoche. The journal is also translated into Dutch and German. Since 1975 the journal issues a yearly special edition.

Sunrise is a theosophic journal, and the articles reflect this. They cover philosophic, spiritual and scientific themes.

External links
 Sunrise 
 Sunrise in the U.K. 
 Overview

Magazines about spirituality
Magazines established in 1951
Magazines published in California
Mythology magazines
Religious magazines published in the United States
Theosophy
Western esoteric magazines